Love Amongst Ruin is the self-titled debut studio album by Love Amongst Ruin. It was released on 13 September 2010.

Background

Writing and recording 
After departing Placebo in October 2007, Steve Hewitt enlisted Lamb bassist Jon Thorne and his brother Nick Hewitt to begin writing and demoing new music at his home studio. Hewitt explained that he decided to write with Jon Thorne because he "wanted to play rock drums against somebody playing upright bass. And that’s what we did and the first thing we ever wrote was "Running"". Julian Cope collaborator Donald Ross Skinner was brought in to oversee and co-produce the recording sessions and the collective relocated to Moles Studio in Bath for three recording sessions with producer Paul Corkett over the summer of 2008. The sessions yielded 10 songs, on which Steve performed drums and lead vocals. Mixing began in September and continued for six months before the album was mastered by Brian Gardner in April 2009.

"Bring Me Down (You Don't)" was to be included on the album, but legal trouble with publishers of the band Can resulted in the track being replaced with "Come On Say It". An acoustic version of the song was later released for free via SoundCloud in November 2011. "Come On Say It" featured then-band members Steve Hove, Laurie Ross and Keith York and was mixed ten weeks before the album's release. Other songs which were recorded, but didn't make the cut for the album, were cover versions of  "Rise" (Public Image Ltd) and "Got To Give It Up" (Thin Lizzy), with both being released for free via SoundCloud in July 2012 and September 2020 respectively.

Themes 
Hewitt stated that the album was inspired by "greed, failed relationships, spitefulness and hatred. 90% of the album is inspired by those things. The other 10% belongs to true love".

Reception

Rock Sound gave the album 8/10, saying the album "reveals itself to be an intelligent, complex and confident effort that’s delivered with an energy and determination that seeks to redefine Hewitt as a credible artist in his own right". Soundsphere gave the album 4/5, stating "this is a fine album, with double points for being a debut". Student Beans gave the album 3/5, saying "Love Amongst Ruin captures a range of sounds, packaged as a polished rock album".

Acoustic
An acoustic version of the album was released on 5 December 2011, titled "Acoustic". "Come On Say It" and "Love Song" were omitted from the track list.

Tour
Prior to the tour, Love Amongst Ruin made their live debut at Eurosonic Festival in January 2010 (with bassist Jonathan Noyce) and played two one-off club dates in London the following May and June. Bassist Magnus Lundén joined the band prior to the club dates, but was replaced by Teresa Morini in July. The band followed with an appearance at the Sonisphere Festival at Knebworth Park in August.

The Heaven & Hell tour began one week after the release of the album in September 2010. The first leg began with a three-week jaunt through continental Europe, beginning in Zaandam, Netherlands and finishing in Paris, France in mid-October. Following a two-week break, the tour resumed with seven dates in the United Kingdom and Ireland. Gigs in Southampton (later rescheduled) and Glasgow were cancelled due to drummer Keith York suffering with illness. Following the conclusion of the European tour, the band were invited to support Feeder and The Futureheads in Birmingham at Kerrang! magazine's "X-Mas Party". Keith York quit the band at the end of the year and was replaced by Ramon Sherrington.

In February 2011, the band reemerged with more slots supporting Feeder in the United Kingdom on their Renegades tour. Prior to the gigs, the band slimmed down to a five piece after removing keyboardist/cellist Laurie Ross from the lineup. The band supported the release of the "Alone" single with five shows in France in March, but only managed to play one date of their German tour in April after shows in Hamburg, Frankfurt and Dortmund were cancelled. The band returned to France in May for two dates on the Recycling Party tour, with guitarist Gizz Butt filling in for Steve Hove. The band finished the tour in June 2011 with two headlining dates at the Borderline in London and at the Fête de la Musique in Valence, France. Jon Thorne filled in for Teresa Morini at the latter date.

The band's setlists for the tour were mainly drawn from their debut album, with "Love Song" being the only track from the album which was not played live. A cover of Thin Lizzy's "Got To Give It Up" was a regular inclusion. Owing to the band's shortage of material, encores often included a repeat play of debut single "So Sad (Fade)", in addition to non-album track "Bring Me Down (You Don't)". New song "Pop DC" was premiered in London in June 2011, along with a cover of "Rise" by Public Image Ltd.

Cancelled dates

1 
2

Track listing

Personnel
Steve Hewitt – vocals, drums, bass, guitar, piano
Jon Thorne – bass, guitar, string arrangements
Donald Ross Skinner – guitar, bass, piano
Nick Hewitt – guitar
Steve Hove – guitar on "Come On Say It"
Paul Turner – bass on "Come On Say It"
Laurie Ross – keyboards, cello on "Come On Say It"
Keith York – drums on "Come On Say It"
Tracy Bowen – backing vocals on "Truth"
Emily Reid – backing vocals on "Love Song"
Claire Nicolson – backing vocals on "Truth"
Jo Thorne – backing vocals on "Alone"

Production
Tracks 1, 2, 3, 4, 6, 7, 8, 9, 10 – recorded and mixed by Donald Ross Skinner, Paul Corkett, Steve Hewitt.
Track 5 – recorded and mixed by Donald Ross Skinner, Paul Corkett, Steve Hewitt, Nick Poortman.

Singles
2010: "So Sad (Fade)" (30 August 2010)
2010: "Home" (25 October 2010)
2011: "Alone" (28 February 2011)

References

2010 debut albums
Love Amongst Ruin albums